JChemPaint is computer software, a molecule editor and file viewer for chemical structures using 2D computer graphics.
It is free and open-source software, released under a GNU Lesser General Public License (LGPL). It is written in Java and so can run on the operating systems Windows, macOS, Linux, and Unix. There is a standalone application (editor), and two varieties of applet (editor and viewer) that can be integrated into web pages.

JChemPaint was initiated by Christoph Steinbeck and is currently being developed as part of The Chemistry Development Kit (CDK), and a Standard Widget Toolkit (SWT) based JChemPaint application is being developed, as part of Bioclipse.

See also

 List of molecular graphics systems
 Comparison of software for molecular mechanics modeling

References

External links 
 
 The Chemistry Development Kit

Free chemistry software
Chemistry software for Linux
Free educational software